Negombata  is a genus of sponges in the family Podospongiidae.

Species
Negombata corticata Carter, 1879
Negombata kenyensis Pulitzer-Finali, 1993
Negombata magnifica Keller, 1889

References

Poecilosclerida